The Butterflies of Love are an indie pop band from New Haven, Connecticut, United States.

The band was founded as "Silver Bug" (and then renamed "Bug") in the late 1990s by singer-songwriters Jeff Greene and Dan Greene (no relation, though they attended Hamilton College together), the Butterflies of Love have released two albums on US-based Coffeehouse Records and two albums on British independent label Fortuna Pop! Their fifth single, "It's Different Now", was made Single Of The Week in the NME.

Discography

Singles/EPs
I Read Her Diary b/w Dream World 1994 (under band's previous name, Bug) Coffeehouse Records (clear vinyl)
Rob a Bank b/w Love May Be Possible 1996 Coffeehouse Records (blue sleeve)
Wild b/w The Brain Service 1997 Secret 7 (UK) / Coffeehouse Records (USA)
Rob a Bank b/w Drunken Falls 1998 Coffeehouse Records (green sleeve, nearly identical to 1996 single)
It's Different Now
Wintertime Queen (2000)
The Mutation
Dream Driver
Orbit Around You (2006)

Albums
America's Newest Hitmakers (1996)
How to Know The Butterflies of Love (1999)
The New Patient (2002)
Famous Problems (2007)

References

External links
Band website
Instagram
The Butterflies of Love on Fortuna Pop! website
Coffeehouse Recording Studio

Indie pop groups from Connecticut